Conghaltach mac Etguini (died 808) was Abbot of Clonfert.

Conghaltach is described as Prior, not Abbot, unless he held two offices at once, as did Cormac mac Ciaran and Ruthmael.

References

 Annals of Ulster at CELT: Corpus of Electronic Texts at University College Cork
 Annals of Tigernach at CELT: Corpus of Electronic Texts at University College Cork
Revised edition of McCarthy's synchronisms at Trinity College Dublin.
 Byrne, Francis John (2001), Irish Kings and High-Kings, Dublin: Four Courts Press, 
 Lysaght, Eamonn (1978), The Surnames of Ireland. , pp. 233–34.

People from County Galway
8th-century Irish abbots
802 deaths
Year of birth unknown